Jerusalén is a municipality and town of Colombia in the department of Cundinamarca.

See also 
 Jerusalén, El Salvador

Municipalities of Cundinamarca Department